Death to the Daleks! is a Big Finish Productions audio drama based on the long-running British science fiction television series Doctor Who.

Plot 
Alby continues his quest to find Suz, as she and Kalendorf face the Dalek Supreme Commander.

Cast
Susan Mendes – Sarah Mowatt
Kalendorf – Gareth Thomas
Narrator – Joyce Gibbs
Espeelius – Ian Brooker
Karik – Ian Brooker
Elisonford – Ian Brooker
Stralos – Jeremy Fielder
Barman – Jeremy Fielder
Tanlee – David Sax
Alby Brook – Mark McDonnell
Mirana – Teresa Gallagher
Earth President – Teresa Gallagher
Dalek Voices – Nicholas BriggsAlistair LockSteven Allen

External links
Big Finish Productions – "Death to the Daleks!"

Death to the Daleks!
Audio plays by Nicholas Briggs